Karen Mullins is an American college softball coach, most recently the long-time head coach of the Connecticut Huskies softball team.  She served in that role from 1984 to 2014.  She announced her retirement on May 19, 2014.

Playing career
Mullins played four years of basketball at Connecticut and also two years of softball.  Connecticut was just beginning to establish women's sports during her time as a student in Storrs.

Coaching career
After completing a master's in sport management at UConn, Mullins became head coach at Nichols College in Massachusetts.  She led the team for two seasons, compiling a 10–10 record before moving to E. O. Smith High School as a basketball coach.  In 1984, she returned to UConn as head softball coach.  Mullins would remain at UConn for thirty one seasons, leading the Huskies to 10 top 2 finishes in the NCAA Northeast rankings, eight appearances in the NCAA Division I Softball Championship, a Women's College World Series berth in 1993, six Big East Conference regular season and seven Big East Conference softball tournament championships, and an overall record of 862–626–5.  Over 96 percent of her players graduated, nine earned All-American honors, six were named academic All-Americans, and her players earned Big East Player or Pitcher of the Year awards 11 times.  She retired as one of the top 50 all-time coaches in career wins.  Mullins was one of the longest-tenured coaches at UConn, although many coaches also had remained in Storrs for multiple decades.

Head coaching record

References

Living people
People from Waterford, Connecticut
UConn Huskies women's basketball players
American softball coaches
UConn Huskies softball coaches
UConn Huskies softball players
Nichols Bison softball coaches
Year of birth missing (living people)